South Boardman is an unincorporated community and census-designated place (CDP) in Kalkaska County in the U.S. state of Michigan.  At the 2010 census, the CDP had a population of 536.  South Boardman is located within Boardman Township.

Geography

South Boardman has its own post office with the 49680 ZIP Code.

History
The Grand Rapids and Indiana Railroad was built through the area and platted South Boardman at the juncture of the rail line with the south branch of the Boardman River. Hamilton Stone bought the plat and with associates began operations in 1874, building a depot and hotel. A post office was established in June 1875.

The community of South Boardman was listed as a newly-organized census-designated place for the 2010 census, meaning it now has officially defined boundaries and population statistics for the first time.  The CDP is organized for statistical purposes only and has no legal status as an incorporated municipality.

Demographics

References

Unincorporated communities in Kalkaska County, Michigan
Unincorporated communities in Michigan
Census-designated places in Kalkaska County, Michigan
Census-designated places in Michigan
Traverse City micropolitan area